Ion Corvin is a commune in Constanța County, Northern Dobruja, Romania. It includes five villages:
Ion Corvin -  named after John Hunyadi (historical names: Cuzgun until 1912)
Brebeni (historical name: Ciucurchioi)
Crângu (historical names: Caramat until 1968)
Rariștea (historical names: Gura Orman, Bazarghian)
Viile (historical name: Beilic until 1964)

Demographics
At the 2011 census, Ion Corvin had 1,844 Romanians (95.59%), 26 Roma  (1.35%), 57 Turks (2.95%), 2 others (0.10%).

References

Communes in Constanța County
Localities in Northern Dobruja